We Will Stand/Yesterday and Today is a compilation album by Christian singer-songwriter Russ Taff. This was his final album on the Myrrh label released in 1994. It is a collection of Taff's favorite songs from his solo years on the Myrrh label as well as a couple of songs from his time with the Imperials. It also contains one previously unreleased track, "Your Love Stays With Me", originally recorded by Christian singer-songwriter Gary Chapman on his 1987 album Everyday Man.

Track listing
 "Rock Solid" (from Medals) Tori Taff, J. Hollihan, Jr., R. Brown – 4:08 (*)
 "Walk Between the Lines" (from Russ Taff) Dave Perkins – 5:30 (**)
 "Here I Am" (from Medals) R. Taff, T. Taff, Chris Eaton – 4:11 (*)
 "Believe in Love" (from Russ Taff) C. Eaton – 4:54 (**)
 "Not Gonna Bow" (from Medals) R. Taff, T. Taff, James Newton Howard, Michael Landau – 3:51 (*)
 "I Still Believe" (from Russ Taff) Michael Been, Jim  Goodwin – 4:30 (**)
 "Silent Love" (from Medals) R. Taff, T. Taff, E. Janz, P. Janz, C. Grossman Puig, R. Buchanan – 4:45 (*)
 "We Will Stand" (from Walls of Glass) R. Taff, T. Taff, J. Hollihan, Jr. – 4:37 (***)
 "Farther On" (from The Way Home) R. Taff, T. Taff, J. Hollihan, Jr. – 3:49 (****)
 "Winds of Change" (from The Way Home) Danny Tate, Danny Wilde – 4:17 (****)
 "I Cry" (from The Way Home) R. Taff, T. Taff, J. Hollihan, Jr. – 4:07 (****)
 "Trumpet of Jesus" (from the Imperials album Priority) Michael Omartian, Stormie Omartian – 3:46
 "Praise the Lord" (from the Imperials album Heed the Call) Brown Bannister, Mike Hudson – 3:27
 "Your Love Stays with Me" (previously unreleased) Mike Reid, Rory Michael Bourke – 3:15 (****)

 (*) – produced by Jack Joseph Puig and Russ Taff
 (**) – produced by Jack Joseph Puig 
 (***) – produced by Bill Schnee
 (****) – produced by Russ Taff and James Hollihan, Jr.
 "Trumpet of Jesus" – produced by Michael Omartian 
 "Praise the Lord" – produced by Chris Christian

Personnel 
Your Love Stays with Me

 Russ Taff – lead vocals
 Larry Hall – keyboards
 James Hollihan, Jr. – guitars 
 Jackie Street – bass guitar
 Lynn Williams – drums
 Nashville String Machine – strings

Production
 Russ Taff – producer (14)
 James Hollihan, Jr. – producer (14), mixing (14)
 Hank Williams – editing and mastering at MasterMix (Nashville, Tennessee)
 Diana Barnes – art direction 
 Beth Middleworth – design 
 Jackson Design – design 
 Mark Tucker – photography

Singles

References

1994 albums
Russ Taff albums
Myrrh Records albums
Word Records albums